Duncan Heath (born 1947) is a British talent agent and the co-chairman of the Independent Talent Group, Europe's largest talent agency, based in Soho, London. His clients include many leading figures in the British film industry, including Michael Caine, Maggie Smith, Alan Rickman, Sam Mendes and Mike Newell.

Early life

Heath was born in 1947, the son of Sir Barrie Heath (1916–1988), a decorated former Battle of Britain Spitfire pilot and later chairman of the engineering giant GKN. Their relationship was not always cordial and Heath later recalled that his father disapproved of him entering the entertainment industry, adding that he "wanted me to go work in some dark Satanic mill somewhere".

Career
Contrary to his father's wishes, he began his career in advertising, and then in 1971 joined the William Morris Agency in London as a runner, beginning at the very bottom of the industry. After less than a year he had been fired for behaviour he later described as "insolence and mild violence".

In a later interview with Industrial Scripts Heath elaborated on his dismissal from the William Morris Agency, saying:

Duncan Heath Associates
In 1973 he and his wife-to-be Hilary Dwyer founded the talent agency Duncan Heath Associates. In an interview with the Financial Times in 2002, Heath said "she introduced me to a lot of people - if it wasn't for her it wouldn't have happened." He found the money to start the business by betting the remains of his wages from William Morris on a horse that his mother had running at Newbury. The horse came in at 35:1 and Heath found himself with £3,500, a sum he described as "a shitload of money in the 1970s". He bought a fifty percent stake in a company owned and run by Christopher Long, a former ICM agent, though at first business was slow. "We spent most of our time hanging around theatres asking actors if they wanted an agent. Most of the time they just told you to fuck off."

Duncan Heath Associates did prosper and was sold to the giant US-based talent agency International Creative Management (ICM) in 1985. In 1991 Duncan Heath Associates merged with ICM London, and Heath became chairman of the merged company.

Independent Talent Group
In 2002 he led a management buyout from ICM, returning the group to independence. In August 2007, at the Venice Film Festival, he announced that ICM UK would be renamed the Independent Talent Group, of which he is now co-chairman. His clients include Michael Caine, Maggie Smith, Alan Rickman, Sam Mendes and Mike Newell.

The Independent Talent Group is Europe's largest talent agency, representing many of Britain's leading actors, writers and directors. Its clients include Daniel Craig, Orlando Bloom, Rachel Weisz, Thandie Newton, and Jonathan Glazer. It also has a model agency, representing a number of leading fashion models.

Heath is credited under "Special thanks" on five films: Churchill: The Hollywood Years (2004), The Libertine (2005), Onegin (1999), The Krays (1990), and Buster (1988).

In 2000 he was a jury member for the British Independent Film Awards

Family life
Heath married actress Hilary Dwyer in 1974, although they were divorced in 1989. They have two children, Daniel and Laura. Laura Heath founded and runs the Hope-Martin Animal Foundation in Barbados.

Heath's second wife is film producer Lex Lutzus with whom he has two children, Jacob and Edie Heath.

References
 Article on Duncan Heath and the Independent Talent Agency Ltd in The Hollywood Reporter, 31 August 2007
 "Relative Values" Article on Duncan and Laura Heath in the Sunday Times, 31 May 2009
 "Agent Provocateur", article on Duncan Heath and ICM by Sathnam Sanghera in the Financial Times, 29 January 2002

Notes

External links
 Duncan Heath at www.bifa.org Retrieved 16 February 2010
 
 Official website of Independent Talent Group Ltd Retrieved 16 February 2010
 Article on Duncan and Laura Heath in 'Relative Values in the Sunday Times, 2009 Retrieved 16 February 2010
 January 2002 article on Duncan Heath at www.ft.com Retrieved 16 February 2010

1947 births
Living people
British talent agents